The 1899–1900 Bucknell Bison men's basketball team represented Bucknell University during the 1899–1900 college men's basketball season. The team had finished with an overall record of 6–3.

Schedule

|-

References

Bucknell Bison men's basketball seasons
Bucknell
Bucknell
Bucknell